An election to the Carmarthenshire County Council was held in March 1931. It was preceded by the 1928 election and followed by the 1934 election.

Overview of the result

The Independent group remained the majority grouping on the Council. In the Llanelli area the potential for Labour to win further ground was complicated by the appearance of Communist Party candidates.

Boundary changes

There was one boundary change, namely the division of the existing Llandybie ward into two divisions, each of which was won by Labour.

Summary of results

Only a minority of the 53 divisions were contested. 53 councillors were elected.

Ward results

Abergwili

Ammanford

Bettws

Caio

Carmarthen Eastern Ward (Lower Division)

Carmarthen Eastern Ward (Upper Division)

Carmarthen Western Ward (Lower Division)

Carmarthen Western Ward (Upper Division)

Cenarth

Cilycwm

Conwil

Kidwelly

Laugharne

Llanarthney

Llanboidy

Llandebie North
Boundary Change

Llandebie South
Boundary Change

Llandilo Rural

Llandilo Urban

Llandovery

Llandyssilio

Llanedy

Llanegwad

Llanelly Division.1

Llanelly Division 2

Llanelly Division 3

Llanelly Division 4

Llanelly Division 5

Llanelly Division 6

Llanelly Division 7

Llanelly Division 8

Llanelly Rural, Berwick

Llanelly Rural, Hengoed
Joe Howells stood as an Independent against the official Labour candidate and won by a very narrow margin.

Llanelly Rural, Westfa and Glyn

Llanfihangel Aberbythick

Llanfihangel-ar-Arth

Llangadock

Llangeler

Llangendeirne

Llangennech

Llangunnor

Llanon

Llansawel

Llanstephan

Llanybyther

Myddfai

Pembrey North

Pembrey South

Quarter Bach

Rhydcymmerai

St Clears

St Ishmael

Trelech

Whitland

Election of aldermen

In addition to the 53 councillors the council consisted of 17 county aldermen. Aldermen were elected by the council, and served a six-year term. Following the elections the following nine aldermen were elected (with the number of votes in each case).

References

1931
1931 Welsh local elections
March 1931 events